David Wuo Gbemie (born 19 December 1989) is a Liberian former professional footballer who played as both a center-back and a midfielder.

Career
Gbemie joined the Bolton Wanderers youth team at the age of 13, and signed on loan for Burscough in November 2008. After being released by Bolton, Gbemie signed for Leigh Genesis in September 2009, making two league appearances that season.

Gbemie made his international debut for Liberia in 2010.

References

1989 births
Living people
Liberian footballers
Liberia international footballers
Bolton Wanderers F.C. players
Burscough F.C. players
Leigh Genesis F.C. players

Association football midfielders
Association football central defenders